Desert sun refers to the harsh solar radiation encountered in a desert environment.

Desert Sun may also refer to:

 The Desert Sun, a newspaper from Palm Springs, California, U.S.
 Desert Sun Airlines (1995–1996) a defunct airline subsidiary operated by Mesa Airlines
 Desert Sun Stadium, a soccer stadium located in Yuma, Arizona, U.S.

See also
 Sundesert Nuclear Power Plant, a canceled power station in California, USA
 Sons of the Desert (disambiguation)
 Desert Star (disambiguation)
 Desert (disambiguation)
 Sun (disambiguation)